St. Germain Cathedral is a Roman Catholic cathedral located in Rimouski (Québec). It is the mother church for the Roman Catholic Archdiocese of Rimouski.

History
The church was raised to the status of cathedral on 15 January 1867 by Jean Langevin, first bishop of Rimouski, and was consecrated on 28 May 1853.

The cathedral was spared from the nuit rouge ("Red Night") on 6 May 1950, when nearly half of the town was burnt down by a fire that started at the Price Brothers Company sawmill. Legend has it that a priest sprinkled holy water around the city's cathedral and that the fire would not cross the line.

Design
The exterior of the cathedral is of neo-Gothic influence with pointed arch windows decorated with stained glass, buttress and pinnacles while the interior is influenced by the Gothic style with its ceiling that looks like a diagonal rib vault. Grey stones were used to build the outside. The main vault is 28 m (90 ft) high and the interior one is 18 m (60 ft) high. Three bells, weighing 1,641 kg in total were installed in 1891. The cathedral is famous for its Casavant Frères organ.

Joseph J.B. Verret (architect) designed the Bishop's Palace (1901-01) for Monseigneur A.A. Blais, of St. Germain Roman Catholic Cathedral.

References

 Bibliography: Musique et Musiciens, Retrieved 19 April 2008.

External links

Archdiocese of Rimouski page at catholichierarchy.org, Retrieved 19 April 2008.

 
Buildings and structures in Rimouski
19th-century Roman Catholic church buildings in Canada
Basilica churches in Canada
Roman Catholic cathedrals in Quebec
Tourist attractions in Bas-Saint-Laurent